Dabenarti is an island in Sudan, situated in the middle of the Nile near the 2nd cataract. A fortress on the island was attributed to the Egyptian Nubian period. Construction began during the reign of Senusret I, around 1900 BC, and was completed under Senusret III. With the collapse of Egyptian power at the end of the Middle Kingdom, Dabenarti was abandoned around 1700 BC. It was examined in 1916 by Somers Clarke.

References

Islands of Sudan
Archaeological sites in Sudan
Lake Nasser
Islands of the Nile